Susan Getty is a British figure skater who competed in ice dance.

With partner Roy Bradshaw, she won bronze at the 1971 European Figure Skating Championships in Zurich, Switzerland.

Competitive highlights 
With  Roy Bradshaw

References 

British female ice dancers